The 54th Regiment Illinois Volunteer Infantry was an infantry regiment that served in the Union Army during the American Civil War.

Service
The 54th Illinois Infantry was organized at Anna, Illinois and mustered into Federal service in February, 1862.

The regiment was mustered out on October 15, 1865.

Total strength and casualties
The regiment suffered 1 officer and 11 enlisted men who were killed in action or mortally wounded and 2 officers and 171 enlisted men who died of disease, for a total of 185 fatalities.

Commanders
Colonel Thomas W. Harris - resigned on December 10, 1862.
Colonel Greenville McNeel Mitchell - mustered out with the regiment.

See also
List of Illinois Civil War Units
Illinois in the American Civil War

Notes

References
The Civil War Archive

Units and formations of the Union Army from Illinois
1862 establishments in Illinois
Military units and formations established in 1862
Military units and formations disestablished in 1865